Henry Frayne (born 14 April 1990) is an Australian track and field athlete who competes in triple jump and long jump. He qualified for the 2020 Tokyo Olympics and finished 14th in qualifying with a distance of 7.93m, and did not qualify for the final.

Frayne trains under Gary Bourne who also coaches or has coached Mitchell Watt, Chris Noffke, Jai Taurima and Bronwyn Thompson.

Early years 
Frayne was South Australian born and raised but in 2007, as a 16-year-old, he followed his coach, Vasily Grishchenkov, and moved to Melbourne. He was already a talented triple jumper in his early teens.

Frayne raised the national junior triple jump record three times in 2008 and 2009, and was then placed fifth at the 2008 World Junior Championships. In 2010, he moved to Brisbane under coach Gary Bourne, his current coach. In 2011, he was placed ninth in the triple jump at the IAAF World Championships and his first 17-metre jump.

Achievements 
Frayne won the silver medal in the long jump event at the 2012 IAAF World Indoor Championships in Istanbul, Turkey. Frayne's personal best at long jump is 8.34 m (2018) and at triple jump 17.23 m (2012). He competed at the 2011 World Championships where he placed 9th in the triple jump final. Frayne competed at the 2012 London Olympics in both the long jump and triple jump, and qualified for the 2016 Rio Olympics in the long jump, finishing 7th in the final. He jumped a personal best 8.34 m to qualify for the final at the 2018 Commonwealth Games in Australia, where he finished with the silver medal behind world champion Luvo Manyonga.

He is a nephew of 1984 Olympian Bruce Frayne.

Frayne completed a Bachelor of Commerce at Deakin University.

Competition record

References

External links 
 World Athletics profile
 Athletics Australia profile
 

1990 births
Living people
Australian male long jumpers
Australian male triple jumpers
Athletes (track and field) at the 2012 Summer Olympics
Athletes (track and field) at the 2016 Summer Olympics
Olympic athletes of Australia
World Athletics Championships athletes for Australia
Athletes (track and field) at the 2014 Commonwealth Games
Athletes (track and field) at the 2018 Commonwealth Games
Athletes from Adelaide
People educated at St Peter's College, Adelaide
Commonwealth Games medallists in athletics
Commonwealth Games silver medallists for Australia
Deakin University alumni
Athletes (track and field) at the 2020 Summer Olympics
20th-century Australian people
21st-century Australian people
Athletes (track and field) at the 2022 Commonwealth Games
Medallists at the 2018 Commonwealth Games